The Five Pits Trail is a rail trail in Derbyshire, England. It consists of a network of surfaced walkways for recreational use. The approximately  trail links Grassmoor to Tibshelf. Derbyshire County Council created the Five Pits Trail in 1989, following the route of the former Great Central Railway which served the five main coal mines of Grassmoor, Williamthorpe, Holmewood, Pilsley and Tibshelf.

Part of the trail (between Station Road, Pilsley, and Tibshelf) has been identified as the "Tom Hulatt Mile" and is marked at the side of the trail. This mile commemorates local runner Tom Hulatt who took place in the race that created the first four-minute mile.

The Tibshelf end of the trail runs past Newton Ponds and joins the Silverhill Trail, which connects to the Brierley Forest Link Trail, and to Teversal Trail in Teversal.

Access to the Five Pits Trail is possible via numerous footpaths which cross it and by a number of roads which cross it.  There are car parks provided at several locations: Church Lane in Tibshelf, Station Road in Pilsley, Timber Lane near Astwith, and at both the Birkin Lane and the Mansfield Road entrances to Grassmoor Country Park.

References 

Rail trails in England
Footpaths in Derbyshire